Helliden Castle (Hellidens slott) is a  manor house  at Tidaholm Municipality in Västra Götaland County, Sweden. Today it is the site of Helliden Folk High School (Hellidens Folkhögskola).

History
Helliden was built in 1858 by  Hans Henrik von Essen (1820–1894).   von Essen was owner and operator of Tidaholms bruk which operated the manufacture of wagons and agricultural implements. From 1856 to 1866, he was CEO of the steel and forest industry company Hellefors Bruk. 
In  1868, he was involved in the formation of Tändsticksfabrik AB Vulcan in Tidaholm.

References

External links
Hellidens Folkhögskola website

Buildings and structures in Västra Götaland County